The 2002 Cheltenham Council election took place on 2 May 2002 to elect members of Cheltenham Borough Council in Gloucestershire, England. The whole council was up for election with boundary changes since the last election in 2000 reducing the number of seats by 1. The Liberal Democrats gained overall control of the council from the Conservative Party.

Election result
The results saw the Liberal Democrats gain control after winning an extra 10 councillors.

Ward results

References

2002 English local elections
2002
2000s in Gloucestershire